3 Suara (Malay) is a collaborative album by three Malaysian singers, Jaclyn Victor, Ning Baizura and Shila Amzah. The album was released on January 6, 2011, by Sony Music Malaysia.

Background 
The concept of the album is the sound of Malaysian pop music in the 1980s and 1990s. It is said that the inspirations for the album are local women singers from the 1980s such as Noorkumalasari, Francissca Peter, Zaiton Sameon and more.

Track-listing

Awards

Chart performance

Singles

References 

2011 albums
Jaclyn Victor albums
Shila Amzah albums
Ning Baizura albums
Sony Music albums
Malay-language albums
Collaborative albums